The North Coast Computer Project (NCCP) is an Australian independent not-for-profit social enterprise established in 2003. NCCP focuses on helping aboriginal communities and other organisations and communities access the same level of technology taken for granted by many.

NCCP was originally started as the Clarence Valley Computer Project and has evolved to provide cheap computers, technical repairs and support, and local networking opportunities for lower income and Indigenous persons of the Clarence Valley and North Coast of New South Wales. Some projects have also been carried out in the Philippines. NCCP is a Microsoft Registered Refurbisher and the computers it provides are loaded with registered Microsoft software

Grants and awards
, NCCP had won two national grants for an Indigenous Engagement Project.

In May 2007 the NCCP was awarded the Community ICT (Information and Communication Technologies) Innovator of the Year Award sponsored by Microsoft and Cisco.

E-hubs
E-Hubs are groups of computers, usually 2 to 10, installed, networked, connected to the internet by NCCP at community locations. These computers are protected with software to allow safe access by children. All of the computers are loaded with legitimate Microsoft software, and in some cases, the cost of the computers is covered by North Coast Technical and Further Education (TAFE) financing as part of a TAFE course.

The computers are provided for use at the community’s discretion, and the E-Hubs are often  used for homework centres, as training rooms and classrooms, and for internet access for the general public.

, NCCP had set up Community E-Hubs at the following locations in New South Wales in the Philippines:

New South Wales

Ngaru Village, Yamba
Hillcrest, Maclean
Macksville NCCP Seniors Kiosk
Bowraville
Muurrbay, Bellwood in Nambucca
South Kempsey
Greenhills, Kempsey
Treelands Drive Community Centre
Muli Muli
Box Ridge (Coraki)
Buyinbin, Casino
Cabbage Tree Island
Jubullum (Tabulam)
Indigenous Rising, South Grafton
Coffs Harbour Showgrounds
Townsend Men's Shed
Iluka Men's Shed

Philippines

Zamboanga
Barobo Surigao del Sur
Gibon, Nabas, Aklan

See also
WorkVentures

References

External links
 NCCP website
 yarrawali.net - personal website of Bernie Francis, founder of NCCP.

Non-profit organisations based in New South Wales
Social enterprises
Organisations serving Indigenous Australians